Dagomar Degroot (born February 26, 1985) is an environmental historian, author, and professor at Georgetown University. He co-founded the Climate History Network, an organization of scholars who study past climate change, and established HistoricalClimatology.com, a popular website that explains why studying past climate change matters today. In 2018, he published a book, "The Frigid Golden Age," that argues that the Dutch Republic - precursor state to the present-day Netherlands - was resilient and even adaptive in the face of a period of cold climate known as the Little Ice Age. The book was named by the Financial Times as one of the top ten history books of 2018.

Life and education
Degroot was born in Raamsdonksveer, the Netherlands, in 1985. He emigrated to Canada in 1985, and in 2007 completed a B.A in History and English at McMaster University. After earning an M.A. in history from McMaster in 2008, he received his PhD from York University in 2014. He completed one year of a two-year postdoctoral fellowship at the University of Western Ontario before joining Georgetown University as an assistant professor in 2015.

Research
Degroot argues that environmental changes - on Earth and across the solar system - have had a greater influence on human history than commonly assumed. He is among the first historians to write about the success of societies and communities in coping with past climate change. His work on the Dutch Republic shows that the famous seventeenth-century "Golden Age" of the Republic owed much to the flexibility of the Dutch in coping with a changing climate, and exploiting the less fortunate.

His publications on social responses to climate change in the Arctic, and on relationships between climate change and human conflict, reveal that the impacts of climatic variability on people and on local environments are complex and often counter-intuitive. His new book project, "Civilization and the Cosmos" is under contract with Harvard University Press and Viking Press. It argues that changes in different environments across the solar system have influenced human history in previously unrecognized ways.

Select bibliography

Books

Journal articles

References

External links
 The Frigid Golden Age 
 HistoricalClimatology.com  
 Climate History Network 

Living people
Environmental historians
Georgetown University faculty
1985 births